André Doyen (born 29 March 1949) is a Belgian racing cyclist. He rode in the 1973 Tour de France.

References

1949 births
Living people
Belgian male cyclists
Place of birth missing (living people)